Domfessel is a commune in the Bas-Rhin department in Grand Est in north-eastern France. As with other parts of Alsace and Bas-Rhin, Domfessel has had periods under German rule, and its name is Germanic. Domfessel has been part of France since 1790, with an interlude of German rule 1871-1919.

See also
 Communes of the Bas-Rhin department
 Église fortifiée de Domfessel

References

Communes of Bas-Rhin
Bas-Rhin communes articles needing translation from French Wikipedia